CTR may refer to:

Engineering, science and technology
 Counter mode (CTR mode), a cryptographic mode of operation for block ciphers
 X-ray crystal truncation rod, a technique to measure properties of crystal surfaces
 Current transfer ratio, in an opto-isolator device
 Content Threat Removal, a cyber security technology that defeats content threats

Government
 Cooperative Threat Reduction, an initiative to secure and dismantle weapons of mass destruction in former Soviet Union states
 Currency transaction report, a report about transactions that the Bank Secrecy Act requires U.S. financial institutions to file with the Internal Revenue Service

Media, arts and entertainment
 Contemporary Theatre Review, a British academic journal of performing arts
 Crash Team Racing, Naughty Dog's 1999 video game for the Sony PlayStation
 Crash Team Racing Nitro-Fueled, its 2019 remake

Medicine
 Cardiac resynchronization therapy
 Cardio-thoracic ratio, a measure of the size of heart
 Carpal tunnel release, surgery for treating carpal tunnel syndrome
 Clinical trials registry, an official catalog for studies about health interventions, such as drugs

Organizations
 Center for Transportation Research UT Austin, a research center at the University of Texas at Austin, US
 Center for Turbulence Research, a research institute at Stanford University, US
 Correct the Record, an American political action committee which supported Hillary Clinton's 2016 presidential campaign
 Computing-Tabulating-Recording Company, a company that was renamed IBM in 1924

Transport
 Aerolíneas Centauro (ICAO airline designator), an airline in Mexico
 Cattle Creek Airport, Australia (IATA code CTR)
 Controlled traffic region, a controlled airspace zone, typically around airports
 Carlton Trail Railway, a Saskatchewan, US shortline railway
 Chester railway station (station code), England

Automobile models
 Honda Civic Type R, a car manufactured by Honda
 Ruf CTR, a car by Ruf Automobile of Germany

Other uses
 Click-through rate, a measure of the success of an online advertising campaign
 "Choose the right", a common Latter Day Saint saying, often found on a CTR ring
 Close target reconnaissance, a military term for scouting in extremely close proximity to the target
 Competitive trail riding, an equestrian sport
 Costa Rica, ITU country code